Sir Rodney Graham Page   (30 June 1911 – 1 October 1981) was a British solicitor, businessman and Conservative Party politician who was the Member of Parliament for Crosby from 1953 until his death.

Background
Page was born in Hertford to Frank Page, a lieutenant colonel, and Margaret Page (née Farley). He was educated at Magdalen College, Oxford, and the University of London, where he received a bachelor of laws degree, and then became a solicitor. During World War II, he was a flight lieutenant within the Royal Air Force Volunteer Reserve. He was named an MBE in 1944. Page was a Privy Council appeal agent and a company and building society director.

Political career
Page was the unsuccessful Conservative candidate for Islington North in 1950 and 1951. He was elected an MP at a by-election in 1953, for Crosby. 

As an MP, he chaired the Select committee on Statutory Instruments from 1964 to 1966. He was appointed a Privy Counsellor in 1972. Page was the Minister of State for Local Government and Development from June to October 1970, and then became the Minister of State for Housing and Local Government in the Department of the Environment from then until the Conservative Government lost the February 1974 general election. He took a particular interest in government administration and played a significant part in the reorganisation of local government and water authorities in the early 1970s. When he was re-elected for the second time in 1974, he had a majority of over 19,000 votes.

Page won his last general election victory at the 1979 general election, and was knighted the following year. He intended to stand down in the following general election, but he died in office before then.

With W. J. Leaper, Page wrote a book called Rent Act 1965 in 1966. He corresponded with Winston Churchill and Enoch Powell. He was a governor of St. Thomas's Hospital, London, and a treasurer of the Pedestrians' Association.

Personal life and death
Page married his wife, Hilda, in 1934, and they had two children. He died from a heart attack in London on 1 October 1981, at the age of 70. In the subsequent by-election for Crosby, the seat was won by former Labour minister Shirley Williams, who became the first person elected to Parliament as a member of the Social Democratic Party.

References

Times Guide to the House of Commons, 1966, 1979 and 1983 editions

External links 
 

1911 births
1981 deaths
20th-century British businesspeople
20th-century British lawyers
Alumni of Magdalen College, Oxford
Alumni of the University of London
British real estate businesspeople
British solicitors
Conservative Party (UK) MPs for English constituencies
Knights Bachelor
Members of the Order of the British Empire
Members of the Privy Council of the United Kingdom
Ministers of State for Housing (UK)
Royal Air Force Volunteer Reserve personnel of World War II
UK MPs 1951–1955
UK MPs 1955–1959
UK MPs 1959–1964
UK MPs 1964–1966
UK MPs 1966–1970
UK MPs 1970–1974
UK MPs 1974
UK MPs 1974–1979
UK MPs 1979–1983